São João das Lampas is a former civil parish in the municipality of Sintra, Lisbon District, Portugal. In 2013, the parish merged into the new parish São João das Lampas e Terrugem. The population in 2011 was 11,392, in an area of 57.50 km².

References

Former parishes of Sintra